Ken Rosato is an American journalist.  He graduated from Regis High School in New York City and then went on to get a bachelor's degree in Film, TV and Radio at New York University.  Following his undergraduate studies, he received a master's degree in Spanish and Italian. Rosato is the anchor of WABC-TV's morning newscasts alongside Shirleen Allicot.
Rosato replaced Steve Bartelstein, who was dropped from WABC-TV on March 13, 2007.  Rosato had been working as a reporter for the station since December 2003.

Career 
Prior to working at WABC-TV, Rosato worked at WNYW-TV (New York City) as an anchor and reporter from 2002-2003. Like his colleagues Jeff Pegues and Phil Lipof, Rosato spent time in Miami/Fort Lauderdale, Florida as an anchor at WFOR-TV from 1998-2002. Rosato also was a panelist for "WLIW 21 Edition" on WLIW21.

Rosato also worked as an anchor for 50,000 watt 1010 WINS Radio in New York City, and was News Director and main anchor at 50,000 watt WBLI-FM/Long Island (where he was known as "Ken Rhodes") and WLNY-TV/New York (now owned by CBS).

Rosato also has experience as a Top 40 radio host, and has worked at such stations as WVIP-FM 106.3, Mount Kisco, NY; WSPK-FM "K-104.7", Poughkeepsie, NY; and WFLY-FM "Fly-92" in Albany, NY.

Transition from reporter to anchor
On the morning of July 6, 2007, it was announced that Rosato would be joining Lori Stokes and Bill Evans on Eyewitness News This Morning and Eyewitness News at Noon.

Rosato only began to regularly fill in at the anchor desk on June 4, 2007. According to the New York Daily News, "Of all the reporters and anchors that have sat in during the four month trial period, Rosato stands out from the rest when he sits next to Lori." WABC-TV's managers also commented that Rosato would replace Bartelstein exactly four months to the date of Bartelstein's last newscast for Channel 7. Rosato successfully competed against a number of  reporters, including weekend morning anchors Michelle Charlesworth, Phil Lipof and his fellow morning colleague Lisa Colagrossi. WABC-TV also stated that Mr. Rosato "provided the most journalistic credibility".

Rosato officially assumed the role of morning and noon anchor on July 9, 2007, although he has filled-in since July 5.

He won an Emmy Award for his reporting a steam pipe explosion in New York City on July 19, 2007.

On April 29, 2010 it was announced that Rosato would return to Eyewitness News This Morning that day after being on leave for 3 weeks following surgery to remove a non-functional kidney.

References

1967 births
Living people
American television journalists
Television anchors from New York City
New York (state) television reporters
Television personalities from New Rochelle, New York
American male journalists
New York University alumni
Regis High School (New York City) alumni